Chris Stockwell (March 9, 1957 – February 10, 2018) was a Canadian politician from Ontario. He was a Progressive Conservative member of the Legislative Assembly of Ontario from 1990 to 2003, and served as Speaker of the legislature and cabinet minister in the governments of Mike Harris and Ernie Eves.  Before entering provincial politics, he had been a member of Etobicoke City Council and the Metro Toronto Council. Stockwell's father, Bill Stockwell, was also a prominent municipal politician.

Politics

Municipal
Stockwell was elected as a city of Etobicoke Controller in 1982, was defeated in his attempt at re-election in 1985, but was elected to the Metropolitan Toronto council in November 1988 representing Lakeshore-Queensway, in the Etobicoke region, and also served as chair of the Metro O'Keefe Centre for the Performing Arts during this period.

Provincial
Stockwell was elected to the Ontario provincial legislature in the 1990 provincial election, defeating incumbent Liberal Linda LeBourdais by about 4,000 votes in Etobicoke West.  The New Democratic Party won the election, and Stockwell sat on the opposition benches for the next five years.

The Tories won a majority in the provincial election of 1995, and Stockwell was easily elected in his own riding.  Despite his experience, he was not appointed to cabinet by the new Premier, Mike Harris.  He soon developed a reputation as one of the more prominent Red Tories in the Tory caucus.

Stockwell was elected Speaker of the Assembly on October 3, 1996.  He was not Harris's preferred choice for the position, but won with support from members in all three parties.  Stockwell won a reputation for independence in the Speaker's chair, and was not afraid to criticize members of his own party.

Stockwell played a key role in the anti-megacity filibuster of 1997, where the Opposition parties proposed thousands of amendments identical except for a few words. He ruled against the government when they moved that the legislature did not need to vote on each amendment, but in their favor when they suggested that the identical text did not need to be read aloud each time.

In the provincial election of 1999, Stockwell's personal popularity was such that he was able to win an easy re-election in the redistributed riding of Etobicoke Centre after defeating fellow MPP Doug Ford, Sr. for then Progressive Conservative nomination. On June 17, 1999, he was appointed to cabinet as Minister of Labour.

Despite Stockwell's reputation as a Red Tory, he implemented a number of right-wing policy directives as Labour Minister.  He was largely credited with shepherding through the legislature a bill to increase the maximum work-week to 60 hours, and also promoted the Harris government's "Workplace Democracy Act", which made union organization more difficult.  In addition to the Labour portfolio, Stockwell also served as Commissioner of the Board of Internal Economy for a few months in 2001.

Stockwell was a candidate to succeed Mike Harris in the 2002 PC leadership campaign.  During this campaign, he claimed that the right-wing initiatives of Harris's "Common Sense Revolution" were necessary in 1995, but no longer made sense in 2003. He won little support from party insiders, and placed last with four per cent of the vote.  He supported Ernie Eves, the winning candidate, on the second ballot.

On April 15, 2002, Eves appointed Stockwell as Government House Leader and Minister of Environment and Energy.  The Energy and Environment portfolios were broken up on August 22, 2002, with Stockwell keeping Environment.

On June 17, 2003, he resigned from cabinet in the wake of a controversy concerning the misuse of expenses. All expenses were referred to the provincial Integrity Commissioner who at that time was the Honourable Coulter A. Osbourne, a former Ontario Supreme Court judge. He undertook an exhaustive review. In his first report dated January 31, 2003, covering the period from June 26, 1995, to December 31, 2002, the Honourable Coulter A. Osbourne concluded: "I am satisfied that the expenses which I have reviewed, net of reimbursements made, are allowable expenses (see section 15 of the Act)." On June 9, 2003, he stated: "I am pleased to report that all expense claims made for the period January 1st to March 31st met with the requirements of the Act and the Rules Governing the Expenses of Cabinet Ministers, Opposition Leaders and other persons." On June 3, 2004, covering the period April 3, 2003 to March 31, 2004, the Commissioner again stated: "I am pleased to report that all requests for reimbursements were complied with and all expense claims reviewed were subsequently approved."

On July 25, 2003, Stockwell announced that he would not run in the 2003 election. He was later employed as a political consultant.

Attempted return to Toronto City Council

In 2013, Stockwell was one of several candidates for appointment to Toronto City Council to replace Doug Holyday in Ward 3. The Etobicoke Community Council recommended him to the city council as its preferred candidate for the appointment; however, October 10, 2013, the final city council vote selected Peter Leon.  In September 2014, Stockwell registered as a candidate for Toronto City Council in Ward 4 in Etobicoke. He came in fourth place, with 9.24% of the vote, losing to John Campbell.

Death
Stockwell died in Toronto of cancer at the age of 60.

Cabinet positions

Electoral record (partial)

Ward 4 - Etobicoke Centre (October 27, 2014)

Metropolitan Toronto Council, 1988
Lakeshore Queensway
Chris Stockwell - 10,442
Morley Kells - 7,790

Toronto municipal election, 1985

References

Notes

Citations

External links
 

1957 births
2018 deaths
Members of the Executive Council of Ontario
Metropolitan Toronto councillors
People from Etobicoke
Politicians from London, Ontario
Progressive Conservative Party of Ontario MPPs
Speakers of the Legislative Assembly of Ontario
20th-century Canadian politicians
21st-century Canadian politicians
Deaths from cancer in Ontario